Okay is an unincorporated community in Howard County, Arkansas, United States.

The community was so named for the "OK" brand cement manufactured at a local cement plant.

References

Unincorporated communities in Howard County, Arkansas
Unincorporated communities in Arkansas